Boban is the self-titled debut studio album by Montenegrin singer Boban Rajović. It was released in 2000.

Track listing
Njena vrata (Her Door)
Piroman (Arsonist)
Barbika (Barbie)
Ti si mene vezala (You Tied Me)
Aerodrom (Airport)
Svako svoj traži put (Everyone Is Looking For Their Own Road)
Da pređemo na stvar (Cut to the Chase)
Lijepa kao grijeh (Beautiful as Sin)

External links
Boban Rajović's discography

2000 albums
Boban Rajović albums